Angela Bianca Tragni (born 23 January 1944) is an Italian journalist and writer. Over her career, she carried out research in the culture of the Italian region Apulia and folklore of Southern Italy. She also wrote books on history, especially the Middle Ages.

Life 
Bianca Tragni was born on 23 January 1944 in the city of Altamura, in the region Apulia. After she graduated in giurisprudenza (i.e. "law") in Bari and in storia e filosofia (i.e. "history and philosophy") in Florence, she started to write articles on local magazines and newspapers, alternating with her teaching job in Italian high schools. She also dealt with anthropology and folklore and, over her career, she was awarded many prizes related to journalism and culture in general. She later became headmaster of the high school Liceo scientifico Federico II di Svevia (Altamura) (she named the school after Holy Roman Emperor Frederick II of Hohenstaufen).

As a journalist, she wrote articles on some local magazines and some reviews about popular culture on the newspaper La Gazzetta del Mezzogiorno.

In 2004, she also contributed to the founding of association Club federiciano, whose mission is the preservation and enhancement of the historic and artistic heritage of Altamura and Apulia.

Assignments 
 Correspondent from Apulia (Italy) of the French historical association Souvenir Napoléonien

Prizes 
 Sasso di Castalda, Potenza (1976)
 Leader d'opinione, Roma (1980)
 Città di Gallipoli, Gallipoli (1980)
 Nonino Risit d'Aur Percoto (1982)
 Murgia Dibenedetto-Loizzo Altamura (1983)
 Motula, Mottola (1992)
 Antigone, Bari (1995)
 Mandurion, Manduria (1998)
 Cesare Pavese - Cultura del vino, Santo Stefano Belbo (2005)
 Premio Altamura città del pane DOC, Altamura (2007)
 Festa nazionale dell’Astronomia Federico II, Castel del Monte (2008)
 Club Femminile dell’Amicizia, Santeramo in Colle (2011)
 Mimosa d’argento, Taranto (2012)
 Schòla Federiciana, Lecce (2013)
 Giornata dei Talenti, Taranto (2013)
 Pivot Pierino Piepoli, Castellana Grotte (2016)
 Gioconda Smile’s – Accademia Kronos, Bari (2017)
 Terre di Puglia, Santeramo in Colle (2020)

Decorations

Works 
 
 
 
 
 
 
 
 
 
 
 
 
 
 
 
 
  
 
 
 
 
 
 
 
 
  
 
 
 
 
  
  
 
 
 
 
 
 
 
 
 
 
 
 
 
 
 
  (in via di pubblicazione) 
  (in via di pubblicazione)

Publications

References 

Italian women writers
Italian women journalists
1944 births
Living people
People from Altamura